Lionel Belmore (12 May 1867 – 30 January 1953) was an English character actor and director on stage for more than a quarter of a century.

Life and career
Onstage, Belmore appeared with Wilson Barrett, Sir Henry Irving, William Faversham, Lily Langtry, and other famous actors. He entered in films from 1911. In total, he had some 200 titles to his film credit. He was notable as the huffy-puffy Herr Vogel the Burgomaster in Frankenstein (1931). Belmore played bit parts in several 1930s film classics. Unusually, he was a director before he became a prolific actor. He directed from 1914 to 1920, only acting in a limited number of films, until concentrating as an actor from then on.

He was the brother of the actress Daisy Belmore (Mrs. Samuel Waxman) and the actors Herbert Belmore and Paul Belmore. He was the brother-in-law of actress Bertha Belmore. He was married to stage actress Emmeline Florence Carder and they had two daughters. Their daughter Violet had decided to follow in her father's footsteps and go into acting.

He is interred at Valhalla Memorial Park Cemetery in North Hollywood.

Partial filmography

 The Greater Will (1915)
 In the Latin Quarter (1915) (director)
 The Wasp (1918) (director, actor)
 Duds (1920)
 Madame X (1920)
 Godless Men (1920)
 Jes' Call Me Jim (1920)
 Milestones (1920)
 The Strange Boarder (1920)
 The Great Lover (1920)
 Two Minutes to Go (1921)
 The Sting of the Lash (1921)
 A Shocking Night (1921)
 Courage (1921)
 Guile of Women (1921)
Moonlight Follies (1921)
 The Barnstormer (1922)
 Kindred of the Dust (1922)
 Iron to Gold (1922)
 The Galloping Kid (1922)
 Oliver Twist (1922) - Mr. Brownlow
 Peg o' My Heart (1922)
 Forgive and Forget (1923)
 Jazzmania (1923)
 Railroaded (1923)
 Red Lights (1923)
 A Lady of Quality (1924)
 A Boy of Flanders (1924)
 The Sea Hawk (1924)
 The Silent Watcher (1924)
 Try and Get It (1924)
 Racing Luck (1924)
 A Fool's Awakening (1924)
 Eve's Secret (1925)
 Never the Twain Shall Meet (1925)
 Without Mercy (1925)
 Madame Behave (1925)
 Stop, Look and Listen (1926)
 The Blackbird (1926)
 The Self Starter (1926)
 Shipwrecked (1926)
 Bardelys the Magnificent (1926)
 The Checkered Flag (1926)
 The Return of Peter Grimm (1926)
 Return of Grey Wolf (1926)
 Oh Billy, Behave (1926)
 The Demi-Bride (1927)
 The Tender Hour (1927)
 Roaring Fires (1927)
 The King of Kings (1927)
 The Sunset Derby (1927)
 Rose-Marie (1928)
 The Matinee Idol (1928)
 The Good-Bye Kiss (1928)
 Heart Trouble (1928)
 The Play Girl (1928)
 The Circus Kid (1928)
 Stark Mad (1929)
 The Unholy Night (1929)
 Evidence (1929)
 Devil-May-Care (1929)
 From Headquarters (1929)
 Hell's Island (1930)
 The Rogue Song (1930)
 Captain of the Guard (1930)
 Frankenstein (1931)
 Alexander Hamilton (1931)
 Shanghaied Love (1931)
 Ten Nights in a Bar-Room (1931)
 Police Court (1932)
 Vanity Fair (1932)
 The Man Called Back (1932)
 Malay Nights (1932)
 The Vampire Bat (1933)
 Oliver Twist (1933) - Bumble
 Jane Eyre (1934)
 Caravan (1934)
 Cleopatra (1934)
 Red Morning (1934)
 Mark of the Vampire (1935) bit part 
 Maid of Salem (1937)
 The Toast of New York (1937)
 Service de Luxe (1938)
 The Adventures of Robin Hood (1938) - Humility Prim (uncredited)
 Son of Frankenstein (1939)
 The Hunchback of Notre Dame (1939)
 Tower of London (1939)
 The Sun Never Sets  (1939)
 My Son, My Son! (1940)
 The Ghost of Frankenstein (1942)
 The Captain from Köpenick (completed in 1941, released in 1945)

Footnotes

External links

 
 

1867 births
1953 deaths
English male film actors
English male silent film actors
19th-century English male actors
English male stage actors
20th-century English male actors
Burials at Valhalla Memorial Park Cemetery
British expatriate male actors in the United States